, sometimes abbreviated as simply omo, is a form of fetish subculture originating and predominately recognized in Japan, in which participants experience arousal from having a full bladder or wetting themselves, wearing a diaper, 
or from seeing someone else experiencing a full bladder or wetting themselves.

Outside Japan, it is not usually distinguished from urolagnia, or water sports, though they are different things: the Handbook of Clinical Sexuality for Mental Health Professionals specifically defines omorashi as persistent sexual arousal toward a full bladder. Dr. J. Paul Fedoroff acknowledges this distinction, observing that "The theme of taking control of autonomic process is prominent in the paraphilia known as omorashi, which involves sexual arousal associated with the sensation of needing to urinate due to a full bladder." Westerners who make the distinction sometimes use the term "bladder desperation" to do so, though some fetishist communities in the West adopt the more specific Japanese language terminology. The word is also occasionally romanized as "omorasi" in the Kunrei-shiki romanization system. In the English-speaking BDSM community, the term "bathroom use control" is used to describe omorashi play in which the dominant controls how and when the submissive is allowed to use the bathroom.

Attitudes toward sexuality in omorashi media
Most fetish activities concerning the use of bodily waste are considered by the general public as "hardcore", taboo, or edgeplay. However, because the object of the fetish is clothed incontinence, omorashi videos do not necessarily feature direct sexual contact, though some use it as a form of foreplay. The focus on clothed (rather than overtly sexual images) makes garment fetishism a prominent feature in most omorashi erotica: commonly featured outfits include school uniforms, those worn by working professionals, and other people attempting to look dignified before succumbing to the need to urinate.

Fetishists who are into this kink may have specific scenarios they enjoy, such as while waiting in line for a bathroom or just doing it for fun in front of the toilet. Regardless of their personal wetting preferences, everyone who is into this kink enjoys watching someone wet themselves or have an accident in clothing.

Japanese subculture
There are many ways in which omorashi fetishism is practiced in Japan.

Yagai
One of the variations is known as omorashi yagai, which translates as "to wet oneself outdoors (or publicly)." A further variation includes yagai hōnyō, or "outdoor (or public) urination", in which the subject publicly removes their clothes to urinate. Other yagai hōnyō practitioners operate much like graffiti artists, attempting public urination acts without being caught.

Diapers
Another variation of omorashi play is omutsu omorashi (おむつおもらし) or omutsu play (おむつプレイ), less commonly called oshime omorashi (おしめおもらし), both of which translate as "to wet oneself in a diaper." This omutsu variation is essentially the same as the standard omorashi, except that the participants are wearing a diaper. Diapers may be favorable for public wetting because they render it more discreet and eliminate mess, and their use is not limited specifically to those with a diaper fetish. However, omorashi fetishists specifically interested in this aspect of the subculture could be considered a Japanese variation of the diaper lover community.

Japanese acceptance of adult diaper use is comparatively high, with the market for such products growing as much as 6–10% a year. However, these are largely intended for and worn by the elderly, with the growth due to Japan's aging population, and younger people wearing these have met with some criticism. In 2012, the Japanese magazine SPA ran an article entitled "The Ultimate Form of Slob", which criticized the trend of young Japanese women who wear diapers to avoid public restrooms. The article included an interview with a 25-year-old woman who had been wearing diapers "instead of going to the toilet" for a period of six months, "wearing [them] almost every day."

Skirt omorashi 

Some individuals find it attractive when someone wets themself in a skirt, since it allows for upskirt views of the wetting. This is referred to as sukāto omorashi (スカートおもらし). This can combine with uniform fetishism, and pornography with skirted performers dressed as high school girls and office workers is common, as well as depictions of skirted people in casual dress.

Fetish films

To avoid Japan's strict censorship laws, which limited depictions of actual sex and pubic hair, erotic films (known as pink films) often relied on fetish elements which could skirt such restrictions. One such film, Terrifying Girls' High School: Lynch Law Classroom in 1973, was the first to depict an omorashi scenario to a cinematic audience. The video depicts a high school girl wetting herself on her desk after drinking gallons of water.

As the AV (adult video) genre took hold in the 1980s, videos specifically devoted to omorashi began to appear. Several notable AV idols have starred in such scenes, including Sakura Sakurada. However, perhaps because of its softcore nature, omorashi never became a clearly pornographic genre.

Today, Japanese omorashi fans also enjoy game show-style videos in which contestants must compete in various urine-holding challenges. The Giga video company's "Desperation Tournament" series is an example of this kind of contest. One such activity is a panel of contestants competing to hold their bladders, or to guess which woman has to use the restroom the most.

Periodicals
Since the 1990s, magazine companies catering to the Japanese kink community have produced a number of periodicals dedicated to omorashi subculture, including most notably Sanwa Publishing's Omorashi Club (rendered phonetically as the wasei-eigo おもらし倶楽部, or Omorashi Kurabu). First published September 22, 1994, Omorashi Clubs success allowed Sanwa to extend the brand in 2006 to include a DVD magazine. The following year, the demand for material catering specifically to omutsu omorashi fandom led to further expansion with the spin-off periodical Diapers Club (おむつ倶楽部, or Omutsu Kurabu). The scarcity of earlier issues of these magazines has caused them to become collector's items.

Anime and manga
Japanese-produced omorashi media also include Manga and Anime. These range from independently produced dōjinshi to large, commercially produced manga. Some focus exclusively on omorashi stories, while others include only the occasional scene. Some contain obvious sexual themes and could be considered a form of H manga, while others, like Mizutamari no dekiru asa, are well known to be suitable for all ages, since they have only mild ecchi content such as panchira.

Wetting scenes have existed in anime as early as the popular Doraemon and Devilman series of the 1970s. However, these did not have the erotic context which characterizes modern omorashi media, since they predated the first full-blown anime pornography, which was not available until 1984, when the advent of the first Hentai OVAs such as Wonder Kids' Lolita Anime were made possible by the widespread availability of home video. One example of this later erotic context is the 1994 Hentai OVA Vixens, which features scenes of incontinence in a setting that is overtly sexual.

Eroge
An eroge (erotic game) is a Japanese video or computer game that features erotic content, usually in the form of anime-style artwork. The crossover of omorashi and anime fandom has produced a number of games such as Water Closet: The Forbidden Chamber which are specifically focused on omorashi. The limited popularity of omorashi in the West has prompted a number of programmers in the scene to create software patches for these Japanese games which translate the on screen text into English.

Some eroge game designers have capitalized on the omorashi fandom's niche market by including the occasional wetting scene in their games as a selling point. MAID iN HEAVEN SuperS, for example, which contains only a single, diapered wetting scene, was used to spin-off an entire set of collectible figures in various omorashi poses. These PVC model figures were created by toy manufacturer Giga Pulse, which is not related to the video company of similar name.

Collectibles

With the translation of omorashi into manga and its subsequent adoption by otaku fandom, a number of omorashi themed collectibles have appeared on the Japanese market, including figurines and "Shizukuishi kyuun kyuun toilet paper" printed with wetting scenes featuring the character Shizukuishi from the omorashi manga, Iinari! Aibure-shon.

Outside Japan
Though there is a small community devoted to such fetishism outside Japan, it is usually overshadowed by the more hardcore fetishes, urolagnia and urophagia. Vice Media has documented an account of an omorashi community existing in the United States since at least 1970. Outside Japan omorashi groups sometimes refer to their shared interest as "desperation/wetting" fetishism, often making a distinction between content featuring males and females. In 2018, People magazine and the New York Post reported the use of the English language portmanteau word "peegasm" among people who practiced "releasing urine after a long period of time" to achieve "a stimulation of pelvic nerves" that "could feel like an orgasmic response." Some English language fetish websites with a focus on females simply identify as "panty wetting." Since such sites abandon the "desperation" title which implies an effort not to wet, they are more likely to include nudity, overtly sexual models and situations, as well as purposeful (as opposed to accidental) wetting. There are still communities which focus on the more tame or softcore aspects of omorashi, which are generally focused on simple wetting in fully or semi-clothed situations without the overtly sexual models and situations. However, this softcore side is more rare in English-speaking communities than the more explicitly sexual omorashi content.

Though there is generally no wide acceptance of incontinence-based play, studies in England have shown that urinary incontinence during sexual activity is a "common, but rarely volunteered symptom" observed in 24% of sexually active women. Moreover, no connection could be identified with any specific abnormality of bladder function associated with these symptoms, indicating that such leakage is both normal and healthy.

Western publications and media
Because of the western stigma in numerous countries against urine, omorashi subculture has not received such diverse exposure in non-Japanese media. In some countries, governments have even banned such materials. In New Zealand for example, creating, trading, distributing (e.g., making available on one's web page) anything promoting or supporting "the use of urine or excrement in association with degrading or dehumanising conduct or sexual conduct" is a felony punishable by up to ten years in jail. Nonetheless, urination is a common fetish in pornography; the 1915 film A Free Ride, widely considered the first pornographic film made in the US, contains scenes of urination.

Print
An early example of urination and skirt-wetting appearing in a sexualized context in the west can be found in the 1928 erotic novel Story of the Eye by Georges Bataille.

Underground periodicals dedicated to pants wetting subculture outside of Japan began to appear in the 1991 with the British underground magazine Cascade, which collected erotic letters related to the fetish that occasionally appeared in older publications such as Fiesta and combined them with original stories, drawings, and photography. This was followed in 1993 by the Australia-based Wet Set Magazine. Wet Set publications were originally only available in English, but readership in German speaking countries proved high enough to justify printing some materials in German. Such publications facilitated the burgeoning subculture by providing opportunities for contact between its members via personal ads. The importance of these printed materials declined with the advent of the internet, and both Cascade and Wet Set ceased publication of physical magazines in the 21st century as the subculture shifted increasingly toward message boards and social media.

Though Wet Set did not generally acknowledge the comparatively large Asian fan base over any other country, it exposed its readers to the Japanese kink community through articles reporting on that subculture's activities. During the 21st century, some Western writers on the subject of omorashi began to recognize the Asian influence upon the subculture in a more direct way. For instance, in a February 2006 issue of The Brooklyn Rail, American poet Garrett Caples of Oakland, California chose to describe the shooting of an omorashi film in a Japanese setting. Aside from lending Western omorashi media an "authentic" quality, the inclusion of Japanese models and settings might also be seen as an attempt to play upon the stereotype of ultrapassivity globally associated with Asian women, further enhancing their perceived moe qualities and catering to Asian fetishists.

Film
In the 1993 film The Cement Garden, themed around incest, a boy tickles his older sister until she urinates in her skirt, with an upskirt view of her wet underwear. The 2002 award-winning film Secretary depicts a scene of bathroom use control in which the submissive has to sit in a chair until she wets her dress.

Fashion
Advent of incontinence fashion 
Despite omorashi subculture's intrinsic relationship to garment fetishism, taboos in the west against relating sexuality and urine prevented mainstream acceptance of overtly sexual garments related to incontinence until the 21st century, when New Zealand-based underwear brand Confitex debuted a line of incontinence lingerie at New Zealand Fashion Week 2015. The organizers stated in a press release that "This is the first time, anywhere worldwide, that incontinence underwear has graced a catwalk as a designer range." In Cosmopolitan Magazine's coverage of the event, they proclaimed that "You Can Feel Sexy Even if You Leak," despite the ban existing in that country against promoting or supporting incontinence-based play. The Sweden-based brand TENA subsequently followed the precedent set by Confitex with their Silhoutte Noir line of disposable incontinence undergarments, which were designed to "dismantle taboos around incontinence." Anna McCrory, senior brand manager for TENA UK, explained the goal of the product as "helping women to feel sexy, confident and able to wear what they like without being restricted by the colour or shape of their underwear, an important step towards normalising incontinence." According to the Canadian Trademarks Database, the word "Omutsu" began to be used in Canada for a line of designer adult diapers in 2017, catering specifically to the omutsu omorashi community in that country.

In 2019, Greek fashion designer and performance artist Dimitra Petsa released a collection entitled Wetness showcasing pants "dyed in such a way that it seems someone peed in them." According to Petsa, the idea for her design came from a piece of performance art in which she deliberately wet herself on a crowded subway in Athens. In a subsequent interview, she explained that though she initially experienced shame at peeing her pants publicly, "Afterwards I felt very free and powerful, but at the same time I felt very naked." She went on to state that models who were asked to wet their pants during the presentation of the collection experienced it as "an emotional process" and an "eye opening experience." She described this as "the ultimate metaphor for letting go – both of my bodily fluids and of my shame" and explained that "shaming is an effective way of keeping women under control. I think that’s one of the main reasons why shame is such a central theme in my work."

Similar sentiments regarding fashion as a tool for overcoming stigmas against adults wetting themselves were previously expressed by the organizers of a 2008 Japanese fashion show for adult diapers aimed at Japan's increasingly elderly population, in which an organizer stated that "Diapers are something that people don't want to look at, but if you make them attractive, then people can learn about them more easily."

Effect on industry 
In 2021, NorthShore Care Supply (the leading direct-to-consumer brand of high absorbency adult diapers and incontinence supplies in the United States) published a statement via their website regarding people who wear their products out of preference rather than medical need. It affirmed that “people who wear adult diapers (aka tab-style briefs) voluntarily […] have been the best thing to happen to the incontinence products industry since the invention of adhesive tape.” According to the website, such people have “driven the whole category past the thin industrial products, past the drug store or even national brands, and into a place where there is a size, fit, thickness, absorbency, color, and yes, even print, for every imaginable application. They are hugely responsible for the mindboggling variety we have to choose from.” 

See also
 Diaper fetishism
 Garment fetishism
 Panty fetishism
 Salirophilia
 Urolagnia

ReferencesWorks cited'
 
 
 
 

Sexuality and society
Japanese sex terms
Anime and manga terminology
Japanese subcultures
Japanese pornography
Fetish subculture
Urine